Miraflores District is one of thirty-three districts of the province Yauyos in Peru.

Geography 
The Miraflores District lies in the Nor Yauyos-Cochas Landscape Reserve. The Cordillera Central traverses the district. Some of the highest mountains of the district are listed below:

References